Salkove is an urban-type settlement in Holovanivsk Raion of Kirovohrad Oblast in Ukraine. It is located on the left bank of the Southern Bug. Salkove belongs to Zavallia settlement hromada, one of the hromadas of Ukraine. Population: 

Until 18 July 2020, Salkove belonged to Haivoron Raion. The raion was abolished in July 2020 as part of the administrative reform of Ukraine, which reduced the number of raions of Kirovohrad Oblast to four. The area of Haivoron Raion was merged into Holovanivsk Raion.

Economy

Transportation
It is on the narrow gauge railway which connects Haivoron and Holovanivsk. The passenger traffic was discontinued in 2019, the station only serves by occasional tourist trains. As of 2021, the railway is in danger of being demolished.

The settlement is connected by road with Haivoron, Savran, and Balta. It has access to Highway M05 which connects Kyiv and Odessa.

References

Urban-type settlements in Holovanivsk Raion